Chalee Tennison is the eponymous debut studio album by American country music artist Chalee Tennison released on Asylum Records on June 8, 1999.

Critical reception

People Magazine's website reviewed Chalie Tennison in its "Picks and Pans" and concluded with the following statement. "Bottom Line: Late-starter locks up a winner"

AllMusic's Maria Konicki Dinoia writes in her review that "Chalee Tennison reminds you of the reasons you started listening to country music in the first place."

Track listing
Track information and credits taken from the album's liner notes.

Musicians
Drums: Shannon Forrest & Brian Barnett
Bass: Spady Brannan
Acoustic Guitar: Michael Spriggs
Electric Guitar: Kerry Marx & Brent Rowan
Piano: Jimmy Nichols, Steve Conn & Billy Kirsch
Hammond B-3: Steve Conn
Steel Guitar & Lap Steel: Sonny Garrish
Fiddle: Larry Franklin
Strings: The Nashville String Machine
Background Vocals: Kim Nash, Bill Nash & Chalee Tennison

Production
Produced by Jerry Taylor
Production Coordination by Lauren Koch
Recorded by Greg Droman, assisted by Joe Hayden & Aaron Swihart at Ocean Way Recording, Nashville, TN
Mixed by Greg Droman, assisted by Tim Coyle at The Sound Kitchen, Franklin, TN
The Nashville Strings arranged and conducted by Kristen Wilkinson
Mastered by Denny Purcell at Georgetown Masters, Inc., Nashville, TN
Art Direction by Susan Nadler
Photography by Jim Shea
Art Direction by Lee Wright & Michael Hagewood
Design by Creative Access, Inc.
Personal Management by Tony Hartley, Tanasi Entertainment
Representation & Council: C. Stephen Weaver
Publicity by Hot Schatz Productions, Schatzi Hageman
Business Management by Collinsworth, Bright and Assoc., Clyde Bright
Booking by William Morris Agency

References

External links
Asylum Records Official Site

1999 debut albums
Asylum Records albums
Chalee Tennison albums